Scarface may refer to:

Gangster-related
 Scarface (novel), a novel by Armitage Trail, loosely based on Capone's rise to power.
 Scarface (1932 film), a film starring Paul Muni
 Scarface (1983 film), a remake starring Al Pacino
 Scarface (soundtrack), a soundtrack for the 1983 film
 "Scarface (Push It to the Limit)", a 1983 song from the Scarface soundtrack
 Scarface: Money. Power. Respect., a 2006 PlayStation Portable game
 Scarface: The World Is Yours, a 2006 video game
 Scarface (iOS game), a 2012 role-playing iOS game

Characters 
 Scarface (comics) or Ventriloquist, an enemy of Batman 
 Scarface (Kinnikuman), a character in Kinnikuman Nisei
 Scarface, a character in The Animals of Farthing Wood
 Scarface, a character in Mega Man X: Command Mission
 Scarface, a character in Predator: Concrete Jungle
 Scarface or Vy Low, a character in Shadow Skill
 Scarface, a character in Smash TV
 Scarface One, a character in Ace Combat 2
 Tony Montana, the protagonist of Scarface (1983) and Scarface: The World Is Yours, nicknamed "Scarface"

Other uses
 Scarface (rapper) (born 1970), American, member of the Geto Boys
 Scarface, nickname of José Aldo (born 1986), Brazilian mixed martial artist
 Scarface, California, a community in Modoc County
 Scarface (lion)

See also
 Scarface Charley (1851–1896), chief of the Modoc Native American tribe
 Scarface Claw, a fictional tom cat in Hairy Maclary children's stories 
 Scarface gang, a Belgian criminal gang responsible for armed robberies
 Scarface Nation, a 2008 book on the 1983 film Scarface